Zhan Ziqian (c. mid to late 6th century) was a famous painter of ancient China from Yangxin County in modern-day Shandong province. His birth and death dates are unknown. It is known that in the Sui dynasty (581–618)  he was appointed to the office of Chaosan Dafu and later of Zhangnei Dudu.

According to the historical documents, Zhan Ziquan painted a number of genres and religion paintings which have not survived. He was especially noted for his paintings of pavilions and people, and horses. His paintings of people were particularly lifelike. The only painting by him that survives today is Strolling About in Spring, which is a perspective arrangement of mountains. It has been cited as the earliest surviving work of Chinese landscape painting or the first shan shui painting.

Notes

References
Barnhart, R. M. et al. (1997). Three thousand years of Chinese painting. New Haven, Yale University Press. 
Ci hai bian ji wei yuan hui. Ci hai . Shanghai: Shanghai ci shu chu ban she , 1979.

Sui dynasty painters
Sui dynasty politicians
Politicians from Binzhou
Painters from Shandong